Take the Money and Run is a 1969 comedy film by Woody Allen.

Take the Money and Run may also refer to:

Songs
 "Take the Money and Run" (Bunny Walters song), 1972
 "Take the Money and Run", by Crosby & Nash from Wind on the Water, 1975
 "Take the Money and Run" (Steve Miller Band song), 1976
 "Take the Money and Run", by Gerry Rafferty from Night Owl, 1979
 "Take the Money and Run", by Alan Parsons from Alan Parsons Live, 1994
 "Solo Impala (Take the Money and Run)", by the Fashion from The Fashion, 2007
 "Take the Money and Run" (O'G3NE song), 2016

Television
 Take the Money and Run (TV series), a 2011 American reality game show
 "Take the Money and Run" (CSI: Crime Scene Investigation), an episode

Other uses
Take the Money and Run (artwork), 2021 work by Jens Haaning